Leif Pagrotsky (born 20 October 1951 in Gothenburg) is a Swedish politician, economist, and diplomat. He held the position of Consul General of Sweden in New York City.

Early life and education 
Leif Pagrotsky grew up in the Björkekärr district of Gothenburg. In his youth, he worked as a docker.
Pagrotsky graduated from the University of Gothenburg with a Bachelor of Arts and a Master of Science in Economics.

Political career 

Previously, he has held four cabinet-level ministerial positions in the government of Göran Persson from 1996 until 2006, including Minister of Commerce and Industry, Minister for Enterprise, Minister for Culture and Minister for Education. Representing the Swedish Social Democratic Party, Leif Pagrotsky served as a Member of Parliament 2006–2012.

In addition to being Minister of Commerce and Industry, Enterprise, and Minister for Culture and Education, Leif Pagrotsky has held several high-ranking posts in the Swedish Government Offices, including State Secretary for Financial Affairs in the Ministry of Finance and Vice Chair of the Council of Riksbanken, Sweden's central bank. He has served as Economic Advisor to the Prime Minister, as well as Head of the Division for Financial and Fiscal Affairs in the Ministry of Finance. Prior to the referendum on Sweden joining the European Monetary Union and adopting the Euro, Pagrotsky argued against, contrary to the Prime Minister and the majority of the Social Democratic Party leadership.

Leif Pagrotsky also worked as an economist at Riksbanken and at the Organization for Economic Co-operation and Development (OECD). He was Chairman of the Swedish Trade and Invest Council Business Sweden, as well as Business Region Gothenburg. His financial focus has been on the internal market, globalization, energy policy, and state-owned enterprises.

Leif Pagrotsky has represented Sweden in the EU, OECD, WTO, UNCTAD, UNESCO and ASEM (ASEAN-EU).

In addition to Leif Pagrotsky's finance-related positions he has been an advocate for the arts. He has been a board member of the National Theatre of Norway and the Swedish Performing Rights Society (STIM).

Diplomatic career 
From 17 December 2015 to 1 October 2018, Pagrotsky was Consul General of Sweden in New York City. At this position, he focused on the promotion of Sweden in a broad sense, including trade and investment, cultural and consular affairs. In 2018, Pagrotsky announced permanent retirement from politics following a long and fulfilling political career.

Media 
Leif Pagrotsky has been featured in both national and international press and media, he has also authored countless articles himself. One of his most recognized appearances was on The Daily Show with Jon Stewart and a segment called “The Stockholm Syndrome.”

Personal life 
Pagrotsky is a Jew, and has been faced with threats because of this.

References

External links
 Pagrotsky on the Swedish economy, in conversation with Big Think.

1951 births
Living people
People from Gothenburg
University of Gothenburg alumni
Swedish Ministers for Culture
Swedish Social Democratic Party politicians
Consuls-general of Sweden
Members of the Riksdag 2002–2006
Swedish Ministers for Education
Swedish Ministers for Nordic Cooperation